Tetra-n-butylammonium fluoride, commonly abbreviated to TBAF and n-Bu4NF, is a quaternary ammonium salt with the chemical formula (CH3CH2CH2CH2)4N+F−. It is commercially available as the white solid trihydrate and as a solution in tetrahydrofuran.  TBAF is used as a source of fluoride ion in organic solvents.

Preparation and properties
TBAF can be prepared by passing hydrofluoric acid through an ion-exchange resin, followed by tetrabutylammonium bromide. Upon evaporation of the water, TBAF can be collected as an oil in quantitative yield.

Preparing anhydrous samples is of interest as the basicity of fluoride increases by more than 20 pK units on passing from aqueous to aprotic solvent. However, heating samples of the hydrated material to 77 °C under vacuum causes decomposition to the hydrogen difluoride salt. Similarly, samples dried at 40 °C under high vacuum still contain 10-30 mol% of water and some 10% of difluoride. Instead, anhydrous TBAF has been prepared by the reaction of hexafluorobenzene and tetrabutylammonium cyanide. Solutions of the salt in acetonitrile and dimethyl sulfoxide are stable.

Reactions and uses
Because the fluoride ion is such a strong hydrogen bond acceptor, its salts tend to be hydrated and of limited solubility in organic solvents. As a fluoride ion source, TBAF solves this problem, although the nature of the fluoride is uncertain because TBAF samples are almost always hydrated, resulting in the formation of bifluoride (HF2−) hydroxide (OH−) as well as fluoride.  Many applications tolerate heterogeneous or ill-defined fluoride sources.

As a fluoride source in organic solvents, TBAF is used to remove silyl ether protecting groups. It is also used as a phase transfer catalyst and as a mild base. As a deprotecting agent, TBAF in DMSO will convert O-silylated enolates into carbonyls.  With C-Si bonds, TBAF gives carbanions that can be trapped with electrophiles or undergo protonolysis.

References

Further reading
 .

Tetrabutylammonium salts
Fluorides
Nonmetal halides
Reagents for organic chemistry